The Blade may refer to:

Culture

Film
 The Blade (film), a 1995 martial arts film by Tsui Hark

Music
 The Blade (Sol Invictus album), a 1997 album by Sol Invictus
 The Blade (Ashley Monroe album), a 2015 album by Ashley Monroe

Other uses in culture
 The Blade (Toledo), a newspaper published in Toledo, Ohio
 Washington Blade, an LGBT newspaper
 The New York Blade, an LGBT newspaper

People
 Mitch Daniels or the Blade, American politician
 Brian Gamble or the Blade, American professional wrestler and martial artist
 Braxton Sutter or the Blade, American professional wrestler
 Dexter Jackson (bodybuilder) or the Blade

Other
 The Blade, Manchester, a skyscraper in Manchester, England
 The Blade, Reading, a high-rise in Reading, Berkshire
 The Blade, a swinging ship at Alton Towers
 A nickname for Technoblade

See also 
 Blade (disambiguation)

Lists of people by nickname